Ustad Nazim Hussain is an Indian tabla player and popularly known as Ustad Nazim Hussain Bismillah Khan and also called as Nazim Bhai. He is the youngest son of shehnai master Ustad Bismillah Khan, whom he accompanied as well.
Nazim Hussain has accompanied his father disciples Pandit Dr. S. Ballesh and Dr. Krishna Ballesh in several concerts on tabla

Career
Nazim gave his first concert in chennai at age sixteen in a Music conference accompanying his father along with performed by Ustad Bade Gulam Ali Khan and Ustad Vilayat Khan, Nazim is one of the Chief Patrons along Maestro Ilaiyaraaja and A.R. Rahman of Tansen Academy Of Music, founded by Ballesh and his son Krishna Ballesh, In 2005 he performed a tribute concert in Chennai organized by  Tansen  Academy of Music. He is teaching Guru of Tabla in the academy.

Awards 
Nazim was awarded with Yash Bharati Award, the highest civilian award conferred by Uttar Pradesh Chief Minister , in 2017

References

External links
 News.oneindia.in
 Monsoon session at Articles.timesofindia.indiatimes.com
 Newindianexpress.com
 Hindu.com
 Simfy.de
 hindustantimes.com
 
  

Hindustani instrumentalists
1963 births
Living people